Probole alienaria, the alien probole, is a species of geometrid moth in the family Geometridae. It is found in North America.

The MONA or Hodges number for Probole alienaria is 6837.

References

Further reading

 

Ennominae
Articles created by Qbugbot
Moths described in 1855